Carphalea is a genus of flowering plants in the family Rubiaceae. It is endemic to Madagascar.

Species 
, Plants of the World Online accepted three species:
 Carphalea cloiselii Homolle
 Carphalea linearifolia Homolle
 Carphalea madagascariensis Lam.

References 

Rubiaceae genera
Knoxieae
Endemic flora of Madagascar
Taxonomy articles created by Polbot